For the 1967 CONCACAF Championship, a total of 10 teams entered the competition. The 8 teams were divided into 2 groups in which the top 2 in each group advanced to the final tournament.

Group 1
Played in Kingston, Jamaica.

The group was also referred to as the Red Stripe Trophy within Jamaica. The group was sponsored by Desnoes & Geddes, the brewery of Red Stripe beer. 

Haiti and Trinidad and Tobago qualified for the final tournament.

Group 2
Played in Ciudad de Guatemala, Guatemala.

Guatemala and Nicaragua qualified for the final tournament.

References  

 RSSSF.com.

1967
qualification
1967
1967